Pohlheim is a town in the district of Gießen, in Hessen, Germany. It is situated 6 km south of Gießen.

References

Giessen (district)